Craig Anthony Wilding (born 30 October 1981) is an English former professional footballer who played as a striker in the Football League for York City, in non-League football for Stafford Rangers, and was on the books of Chesterfield without making a league appearance.

References

External links

1981 births
Living people
Footballers from Birmingham, West Midlands
English footballers
Association football forwards
Chesterfield F.C. players
York City F.C. players
Stafford Rangers F.C. players
English Football League players